Laurie Potter (born 7 November 1962) is an English former cricketer. He captained England and Australia at under-19 level. He played first-class cricket in England and South Africa for Kent, Griqualand West, Leicestershire and Orange Free State.

Early life
Potter was born in England but brought up in Australia. He played for West Perth (now known as Willetton), Willetton, Western Australia, in Western Australian grade cricket where he holds a club record for the largest second wicket partnership.

Under-19 international
He is the only person to captain both the Australian and English cricket teams, these being at under 19 level. He toured Pakistan in 1981 as the Australian u/19 captain (scoring 108 not out in the 3rd Test) and then captained England u/19 against the West Indies in 1982.

Post-first-class career
After finishing his first class career, Potter captained Cannock Cricket Club in the Birmingham League, where for a time he was captain to the teenage Kevin Pietersen.

He later had stints at Market Harborough and Hinckley.

Statistics 
He has played in 223 First class games scoring 9,027 runs at an average of 28.93.  He scored 8 centuries and has passed fifty on 50 other occasions. His highest score was 165*.  He also took 177 wickets at average of 38.86 with his best performance being 5/45.  He has claimed 190 catches too.

He played 207 List A games scoring 4,218 runs at average of 24.24. He scored three centuries and passed fifty on 16 other occasions. His highest score is 112.  He has taken 91 wickets at an average of 32.39. His best performance being 5/28.

References

External links

1962 births
English cricket captains
Leicestershire cricketers
Kent cricketers
Living people
Staffordshire cricketers
Free State cricketers
Griqualand West cricketers
Cornwall cricketers
Minor Counties cricketers